Ghotbedin Sadeghi (born April 23, 1952) in Sanandaj, Iran   is an Iranian theatre director, playwright, stage and film actor, and arts instructor. He is also known as a prominent scholar of Iranian arts and culture. Sadeghi established Honar Theater Group in early 80's which is referred to as one of the most serious and artistic theater groups in Iran. His theatrical productions's fame is beholden to Mostafa Abdollahi and Michael Shahrestani who played the leading roles in his plays.

Education
He earned his bachelor's degree from the Faculty of Fine Arts at the University of Tehran in 1975. Later, he completed his master's degree in Dramatic Arts at Sorbonne (Paris 3) University in 1979. Afterwards, he did a Ph.D. in the same field and at the same university, Sorbonne (Paris 3), and graduated in 1985.

Filmography (as an actor)
 Gozaresh yek ghatl (Report on a Murder) directed by Mohamad Ali Najafi, 2007
 Dadsetan (Attorney General) directed by Rafia Bozorgmehr, 2012

Plays (as a director and writer) 
 Hamlet by William Shakespeare, Tehran: City Theater of Tehran, 1991
 Ajax by Sophocles, Tehran: Niavaran Cultural Center – City Theater of Tehran, 1987
 Médée (Medea) by Jean Anouilh, Tehran: City Theater of Tehran, 1988
 Arash by Bahram Bayzai, Tehran : Theater office, 1988
 See Morgh SiMorgh by Ghotbedin Sadeghi, Tehran: City Theater of Tehran, 1990
 Les Fourberies de Scapin by Molière, Tehran, 1992
The wise man and the crazy tiger by Ghotbedin Sadeghi, Tehran: Cultural Heritage organization –Avini  Hall-  France: vile 1993
 Bahram Choobineh by Siamack TaghiPoor, Tehran:City Theater of Tehran, 1994
Rostam’s seven labours by Ghotbedin Sadeghi Tehran:  Sadabad Palace, 1995
 Jam’s weeping by Ghotbedin Sadeghi,  Tehran:City Theater of Tehran, 1995
 Mobarak, the little watch by Ghotbedin Sadeghi, Tehran:  Niavaran Palace, 1996
Times of innocence by Ghotbedin Sadeghi, Tehran:City Theater of Tehran, 1996
Women of Sabra, men of shatila by Ghotbedin Sadeghi, Tehran: Vahdat Hall- Main hall of city theater of Tehran, 1997
 Arash by Bahram Bayzai, Tehran: City Theater of Tehran 1998
 Calligraphy of Love by Ghotbedin Sadeghi, Tehran:  City Theater of Tehran1999
Seven lost tribes by Ghotbedin Sadeghi, Tehran:City Theater of Tehran, 2000
 Sahoori by Ghotbedin Sadeghi, Tehran:City Theater of Tehran, 2001
 Afshin & Boodalaf Are Both Dead by Ghotbedin Sadeghi, Tehran: City Theater of Tehran, 2003
 Dakhme Shirin by Ghotbedin Sadeghi, Tehran: City Theater of Tehran, 2004
 Akse Yadegari by Ghotbedin Sadeghi, Tehran:City Theater of Tehran, 2005
 The Just Assassins (Les Justes) (Adelha) by Albert Camus, Tehran: City Theater of Tehran, 2005
 Memorial of Zariran (Yadegare Zariran) by Ghotbeddin Sadeghi, Tehran:City Theater of Tehran, 2008
 ShekarPareh’s garden by Ghotbeddin Sadeghi, Tehran: City Theater of Tehran, 2009
If you had not gone by Ghotbeddin Sadeghi, Tehran: Cheharsou hall of City Theater of Tehran, 2012
Macbeth by William Shakespeare, Tehran: Iranshahr Theater, 2012

Tele Theatres (as a director)
 Caligula by Albert Camus in channel 4 IRIB, 2003
 L'engrenage (The Gear) (Charkh-dandeh) by Jean-Paul Sartre channel 4 IRIB, 2004

References
    Theater.ir

External links
  

1952 births
Living people
People from Tehran
Kurdish male actors
People from Sanandaj
Iranian Kurdish people
Iranian film directors
Kurdish film directors
Iranian male film actors
Iranian male stage actors
Iranian theatre directors
University of Paris alumni
University of Tehran alumni
Academic staff of the University of Tehran
Academic staff of the Islamic Azad University
20th-century Iranian male actors
21st-century Iranian male actors